Shiel Bridge is a village on the south east shore of Loch Duich at the foot of Glen Shiel, in the Lochalsh area of the Scottish Highlands. It is in the council area of Highland.

The A87 road passes through the village, continuing on along the north coast of Loch Duich, passing Dornie, Nostie and Kirkton on to Kyle of Lochalsh.

The village has few amenities, but includes a caravan park & campsite, pony tours, and a small filling station. Just south of the village are the Five Sisters of Kintail, a sub-range of the Western Highlands containing three Munros (Sgùrr na Ciste Duibhe, Sgùrr na Càrnach, and Sgùrr Fhuaran). Golden eagles, red deer, and wild goats are among some of the area's native species.

Due to the surrounding mountains and forests, Shiel Bridge is a popular site for hillwalkers, accessible via bus from both Kyle of Lochalsh and Inverness. Both the Cape Wrath and Knoydart Trails pass through the village, the latter leading to Suardalan bothy if followed south and west.

References

Populated places in Lochalsh